The 2009 Korean Tour was a season on the Korean Tour, a series of professional golf tournaments. The table below shows the season results.

Schedule
The following table lists official events during the 2009 season.

Order of Merit
The Order of Merit was based on prize money won during the season, calculated using a points-based system.

Notes

References

External links

2009 Korean Tour
2009 in golf
2009 in South Korean sport